Nurit Galron (born March 21, 1951) is an Israeli singer. She is married to Israeli TV and radio journalist Rafi Reshef.

Biography

Early life 
Nurit Galron was born as Nurit Klimburd to Leah Sitin, a former singer in the Jewish Brigade, and Moshe Klimburd.

Discography 

 What the Heavens Give (2006)
 Greatest Hits (2005)
 Goodbye Honey (2000)
 That Place (1996)
 Classic (1995)
 Within The Storms (1992)
  (1989)
 Soul Bird (1988)
  (1986)
 A Gentle Touch (1984)
 Sympathy (1982)
  (1982)
  (1981)
 Nurit Galron (1978)

References

External links 

1951 births
Living people
20th-century Israeli women singers
21st-century Israeli women singers
Jewish Israeli musicians
Jewish women singers